Roy H. Klaffki (1882–1965) was an American cinematographer. He was a founding member of the American Society of Cinematographers in 1919.

Selected filmography

 A Yoke of Gold (1916)
 Barriers of Society (1916)
 The Unattainable (1916)
 Black Friday (1916)
 The Morals of Hilda (1916)
 The Reed Case (1917)
 Treason (1917)
 The Field of Honor (1917)
 Sirens of the Sea (1917)
 The Lash of Power (1917)
 The Wife He Bought (1918)
 Married in Haste (1919)
 His Divorced Wife (1919)
 The Phantom Melody (1920)
 Her Five-Foot Highness (1920)
 Human Stuff (1920)
 The Infamous Miss Revell (1921)
 Three of a Kind (1925)
 Secret Orders (1926)
 The Jade Cup (1926)
 The Adorable Deceiver (1926)
 The Impostor (1926)
 Flame of the Argentine (1926)
 Queen o'Diamonds (1926)
 The Tired Business Man (1927)
 The Wedding March (1928)

References

Bibliography
 Slide, Anthony. The New Historical Dictionary of the American Film Industry. Routledge, 2014.
 Solomon, Aubrey. The Fox Film Corporation, 1915-1935: A History and Filmography. McFarland, 2011.

External links

1882 births
1965 deaths
American cinematographers